|}

The Elite Hurdle is a Grade 2 National Hunt hurdle race in Great Britain which is open to horses aged four years or older. It is run at Wincanton over a distance of about 1 mile and 7½ furlongs (1 mile 7 furlongs and 65 yards, or 3,077 metres), and during its running there are eight hurdles to be jumped. The race is scheduled to take place each year in early November.

The event was established in 1992, and it was initially held at Cheltenham. It was originally contested over 2 miles and 110 yards. It was transferred to Wincanton and cut to its present length in 1994. The race was run a limited handicap between 1998 and 2017 before reverting to a weight for age conditions race from 2018.

Records
Most successful horse (3 wins):
 Sceau Royal - 2016, 2020, 2021

Leading jockey (5 wins):
 Daryl Jacob – Celestial Halo (2011), Zarkandar (2012), Sceau Royal (2016, 2020,2021), Fusil Raffles (2019)

Leading trainer (8 wins):
 Paul Nicholls – Azertyuiop (2001), Santenay (2002), Perouse (2004), Celestial Halo (2009, 2011), Zarkandar (2012), Irving (2015), Knappers Hill (2022)

Winners
 Weights given in stones and pounds.

See also
 Horse racing in Great Britain
 List of British National Hunt races

References

 Racing Post:

 pedigreequery.com – Elite Hurdle – Wincanton.

National Hunt races in Great Britain
Wincanton Racecourse
National Hunt hurdle races
Recurring sporting events established in 1992
1992 establishments in England